"Girls' School" is a song by Wings released in 1977.

Recording and release
Written and produced by Paul McCartney during the first sessions for London Town (before recording was stopped due to Linda McCartney's pregnancy), it was released as a double A-side single with "Mull of Kintyre".  Accordingly, it was part of the band's sole UK number one, spending nine weeks at the top in December 1977 and January 1978. 

Although "Mull of Kintyre" was initially the more air-played song, the AA side was latterly supported by broadcasters including Radio Luxembourg which helped the single sustain its reign at the top of the charts until the beginning of February 1978. "Girls' School" was in complete contrast to its flip side, being an uptempo rock song.

Record World called it "an energetic rocker a la 'Junior's Farm.'"

In the United States, "Girls' School" was the more prominently played side, but it only reached #33 on the Billboard Hot 100 and #34 in Canada.

Personnel
Paul McCartney – bass, lead vocals, percussion, guitar, piano, keyboards
Linda McCartney – piano, percussion, vocals
Denny Laine – guitar, percussion, vocals
Jimmy McCulloch – guitar, backing vocals
Joe English – drums, percussion

References

 Guinness Book of British Hit Singles - 14th Edition - 

Paul McCartney songs
1977 singles
UK Singles Chart number-one singles
Paul McCartney and Wings songs
Songs written by Paul McCartney
Song recordings produced by Paul McCartney
Music published by MPL Music Publishing
1977 songs
Christmas number-one singles in the United Kingdom